The 2018–19 Yale Bulldogs men's basketball team represented Yale University during the 2018–19 NCAA Division I men's basketball season. The Bulldogs, led by 20th-year head coach James Jones, played their home games at John J. Lee Amphitheater of the Payne Whitney Gymnasium in New Haven, Connecticut as members of the Ivy League. They finished the season 22–8 to finish a tie for 1st place. In the Ivy Tournament, they beat Princeton in the semifinals and beating Harvard in the Ivy Championship to win the Ivy League title. They received an automatic bid to the NCAA Tournament getting a 14th seed before losing to LSU in the first round.

Previous season
The Bulldogs finished the 2017–18 season 16–15, 9–5 in Ivy League play to finish in third place. In the Ivy League tournament, they lost to Penn in the semifinal round.

Offseason

Departures

Roster

Schedule and results

|-
!colspan=9 style=| Non-conference regular season

|-
!colspan=9 style=| Ivy League regular season

|-
!colspan=9 style=|Ivy League Tournament

|-
!colspan=9 style=|NCAA Tournament

References

Yale Bulldogs men's basketball seasons
Yale
Yale Bulldogs
Yale Bulldogs
Yale